The Cowboy and the Kid is a 1936 American Western film directed by Ray Taylor and written by Frances Guihan. The film stars Buck Jones, Bill Burrud, Dorothy Revier, Harry Worth, Oliver Eckhardt and Mary Mersch. The film was released on July 1, 1936, by Universal Pictures.

Plot

Cast       
Buck Jones as Steve Davis
Bill Burrud as Jimmy Thomas 
Dorothy Revier as June Caldwell
Harry J. Worth as Jess Watson
Oliver Eckhardt as Dr. Wilson
Mary Mersch as Mrs. Wilson
Burr Caruth as Judge Talbot
Kernan Cripps as Jim Thomas
Lafe McKee as Sheriff Bailey
Silver as Silver

References

External links
 

1936 films
1930s English-language films
American Western (genre) films
1936 Western (genre) films
Universal Pictures films
Films directed by Ray Taylor
American black-and-white films
1930s American films